Mauritius competed at the 1992 Summer Olympics in Barcelona, Spain.

Competitors
The following is the list of number of competitors in the Games.

Results by event

Athletics
Men's 110m Hurdles
 Judex Lefou 
 Heats — 14.45 (→ did not advance)

Men's High Jump
 Khemraj Naiko

Men's Pole Vault
 Kersley Gardenne

Badminton
Men's Singles
Édouard Clarisse

Women's Singles
Martine de Souza
Vandanah Seesurun

Women's Doubles
Martine de Souza and Vandanah Seesurun

Sailing
Women's Sailboard (Lechner A-390)
Marie Menage
 Final Ranking — 261.0 points (→ 23rd place)

Swimming
Men's 200 metres Freestyle
Benoît Fleurot

Men's 400 metres Freestyle
Benoît Fleurot

Men's 1,500 metres Freestyle
Benoît Fleurot

Men's 100 metres Breaststroke
Bernard Desmarais

Men's 200 metres Breaststroke
Bernard Desmarais

Men's 200 metres Butterfly
Benoît Fleurot 

Women's 100 metres Freestyle
Corinne Leclair

Women's 200 metres Freestyle
Corinne Leclair

Women's 400 metres Freestyle
Corinne Leclair

Women's 4 × 100 m Freestyle Relay
Corinne Leclair, Luanne Maurice, Annabelle Mariejeanne, and  Nathalie Lam

References

Sources
Official Olympic Reports
sports-reference

Nations at the 1992 Summer Olympics
1992
Oly